Udora is a small rural community in Ontario, Canada. It has a population estimated to be around 500 and is situated in the most south-eastern part of Georgina, split between York Region and Durham Region. The town was originally known as Snoddon Corners and was the location of the Snoddon Hotel.

History 
In the 1950s, the Independent Toronto Estonian Women’s Association purchased land in the north-west side of Udora, divided the land into 150 subdivided lots for summer cottages to Estonians in Toronto and named the grounds Jõekääru, which means River Bend in English, named because Pefferlaw River runs through the grounds. Local street names in the grounds are also in the native Estonian. With the cottages also came the Estonian Children's Camp, which is still active to date as an Estonian language immersion camp for part of the summer.

Highway 48 (which links Markham to Port Bolster) lies to the north while Highway 12 linking to Whitby and Orillia, lies to the east. Within Udora Ravenshoe Road intersects with Victoria Road/Concession Road 7/Durham Road 1. 
Area code 705 is bounded to the north while the south of Udora is in Area code 905. 
The Canadian National Railway runs north of Udora, having its nearest train station in Pefferlaw.

Udora is located about 10 km South of Port Bolster, at Lake Simcoe. About 20 km S/E of Sutton, about 25 to 30 km SW of Beaverton and Orillia, west of Lindsay, north of Uxbridge, about 50 km north of Whitby, about 80 km north of Toronto and NE of Newmarket, Ontario.

In the centre of Udora (or downtown) on the main road (Victoria), there is a General Store doubling as a functioning post office .
There is also a UPI full serve gas station and convenience store.

West of Victoria lies The Udora Community Hall, opened in 1974, along with a baseball diamond, playground and basketball / tennis (badminton) court. It serves as the fair grounds to "Udora Family Fun Day". In the winter, the court also hosts a small skate rink for kids.

Climate

Local businesses and attractions

Xanadu Studios (home studio of Artist/illustrator Bonnie Lemaire and Cartoonist/Caricaturist Robert Westall)
Riverview Dog Systems (Hidden Fence)
Jõekääru (Estonian Canadians Summer camp)
Udora/Leaskdale Lions
One Two Tree Services
Udora General Store
Udora Market / UPI Energy Gas Bar

Nearest places
Pefferlaw, north
Sunderland, east
Leaskdale, immediately south
Uxbridge, 16 km south
Zephyr, southwest
Sutton, west

Community demographics
Total Population: 510
Total Dwellings: 278
Total Land Area: 5.5206

References

External links
Town of Georgina
Community demographics from Industry Canada

Estonian diaspora
Communities in Georgina, Ontario